Anxin is a county in central Hebei province, China. Most of Baiyang Lake is located in the county.

Anxin forms part of the Xiong'an New Area designated by the government in 2017.

Administrative divisions
There are nine towns and three townships under the county's administration.

Towns:
Anxin Town, Dawang, Santai, Duancun, Zhaobeikou, Tongkou, Liulizhuang, Anzhou, Laohetou

Townships:
Quantou Township, Zhaili Township, Luzhuang Township

Climate

References

External links

 
Geography of Baoding
County-level divisions of Hebei